Transducin-like enhancer protein 2 is a protein that in humans is encoded by the TLE2 gene.

Interactions
TLE2 has been shown to interact with TLE1 and HES1.

References

Further reading